The canton of Bouligny is an administrative division of the Meuse department, northeastern France. It was created at the French canton reorganisation which came into effect in March 2015. Its seat is in Bouligny.

It consists of the following communes:
 
Amel-sur-l'Étang
Arrancy-sur-Crusnes
Billy-sous-Mangiennes
Bouligny
Dommary-Baroncourt
Domremy-la-Canne
Duzey
Éton
Foameix-Ornel
Gouraincourt
Lanhères
Loison
Mangiennes
Morgemoulin
Muzeray
Nouillonpont
Pillon
Rouvres-en-Woëvre
Rouvrois-sur-Othain
Saint-Laurent-sur-Othain
Saint-Pierrevillers
Senon
Sorbey
Spincourt
Vaudoncourt
Villers-lès-Mangiennes

References

Cantons of Meuse (department)